Raymond Green was a broadcaster.

Raymond Green may also refer to:

Raymond Green (politician), U.S. Representative from Texas

See also
Ray Green (disambiguation)
Raymond Greene (disambiguation)